Dunama ravistriata is a moth in the  family Notodontidae. It is found in French Guiana and Brazil.

The length of the forewings is 14–15 mm for males and 14–17 mm for females.

References

Moths described in 1976
Notodontidae of South America
Moths of South America